The compensation law of mortality (or late-life mortality convergence) states that the relative differences in death rates between different populations of the same biological species decrease with age, because the higher initial death rates in disadvantaged populations are compensated by lower pace of mortality increase with age. The age at which this imaginary (extrapolated) convergence of mortality trajectories takes place is named the "species-specific life span" (see Gavrilov and Gavrilova, 1979).  For human beings, this human species-specific life span is close to 95 years (Gavrilov and Gavrilova, 1979; 1991).

Compensation law of mortality is a paradoxical empirical observation, and it represents a challenge for methods of survival analysis based on proportionality assumption (proportional hazard models).  The compensation law of mortality also represents a great challenge for many theories of aging and mortality, which usually fail to explain this phenomenon.  On the other hand, the compensation law follows directly from reliability theory, when the compared systems have different initial levels of redundancy.

See also

 Ageing
 Biodemography of human longevity
 Biogerontology
 Demography
 Mortality
 Reliability theory of aging and longevity

References
Gavrilov LA,  Gavrilova NS.   "Reliability Theory of Aging and Longevity."   In:  Masoro E.J. & Austad S.N.. (eds.):  Handbook of the Biology of Aging,  Sixth Edition. Academic Press. San Diego, CA, USA, 2006, 3-42.  
Gavrilov LA, Gavrilova NS. Why We Fall Apart. Engineering's Reliability Theory Explains Human Aging. IEEE Spectrum, 2004, 41(9): 30–35.
Gavrilov L.A., Gavrilova N.S. "The quest for a general theory of aging and longevity".  Science's SAGE KE (Science of Aging Knowledge Environment) for 16 July 2003; Vol. 2003, No. 28, 1–10.   https://www.science.org/loi/sageke,  
Gavrilov L.A., Gavrilova N.S. The reliability theory of aging and longevity. Journal of Theoretical Biology, 2001, 213(4): 527–545.  
Leonid A. Gavrilov & Natalia S. Gavrilova (1991), The Biology of Life Span: A Quantitative Approach. New York: Harwood Academic Publisher, 
Gavrilov, L.A., Gavrilova, N.S.  "Determination of species length of life". Doklady Akademii Nauk SSSR, 1979, 246(2): 465–469. English translation by Plenum Publ Corp: pp. 905–908.  
Gavrilov, L.A.  "A mathematical model of the aging of animals". Doklady Akademii Nauk SSSR, 1978, 238(2): 490–492. English translation by Plenum Publ Corp: pp. 53–55.  
Gavrilov, L.A., Gavrilova, N.S., Yaguzhinsky, L.S. "The main regularities of animal aging and death viewed in terms of reliability theory". J. General Biology [Zhurnal Obschey Biologii], 1978, 39(5): 734–742.  

Population
Senescence